Moises López (born 29 June 1940) is a former Mexican cyclist. He competed in the individual road race and team time trial events at the 1964 Summer Olympics.

References

External links
 

1940 births
Living people
Mexican male cyclists
Olympic cyclists of Mexico
Cyclists at the 1964 Summer Olympics
Place of birth missing (living people)